Erdély TV is a generalist television channel from Romania, launched in 2008.

References

External links
 ETV - Site oficial
 ETV pe Port.ro
 ÚMSZ: Televiziune cu secrete?

Television stations in Romania
Television channels and stations established in 2008
Mass media in Târgu Mureș
Hungarian-language mass media in Romania